Russian financial crisis may refer to:

 1998 Russian financial crisis
 Great Recession in Russia (2008–2009)
 Russian financial crisis (2014–2017)
 2022 Russian financial crisis, which began in the aftermath of the Russian invasion of Ukraine.